The Embarcadero and Bay station is a streetcar station in San Francisco, California, serving the San Francisco Municipal Railway's E Embarcadero and F Market & Wharves heritage railway lines. It is located on The Embarcadero at Bay Street. The station opened on March 4, 2000, with the streetcar's extension to Fisherman's Wharf.

References

External links 

SFMTA: The Embarcadero & Bay St northbound and southbound
SFBay Transit (unofficial): The Embarcadero & Bay St

Bay
Fisherman's Wharf, San Francisco
Railway stations in the United States opened in 2000